Crema de fruta (Spanish: "fruit cream") is a traditional Filipino fruitcake made with layers of sponge cake, sweet custard or whipped cream, gelatin or gulaman (agar), and various preserved or fresh fruits, including mangoes, pineapples, cherries, and strawberries. It is usually served during the Christmas season. It has multiple variations, ranging from changes in the fruits used to the addition of ingredients like jam, sago, condensed milk, and others.

An icebox cake variant of crema de fruta also exists, which is much easier to prepare. It is traditionally made with ladyfingers (broas) instead of sponge cake, with layers of custard and fruits. A modern variant of this is the crema de mangga or "mango float", which uses graham crackers, whipped cream, and ripe Carabao mangoes.

See also
 Ube cheesecake
Mango cake
Ube cake
Cassata
Charlotte (cake)
Halo-halo
Mamón
Sans rival
Tiramisu
Trifle

References

Philippine desserts
Fruit dishes
Christmas cakes
No bake cakes
Layer cakes
Sponge cakes
Custard desserts